Washed-rind or smear-ripened cheeses are cheeses which are periodically treated with brine or mold-bearing agents. This encourages the growth of certain bacteria on their surface which give them distinctive flavors. There are hard and soft washed-rind cheeses. The softer ones are sometimes distinguished as "smear-ripened". Conversely, the term "washed rind" is sometimes reserved only for the hard ones.

Production

Washed-rind cheeses are periodically cured in a solution of saltwater brine or mold-bearing agents that may include beer, wine, brandy and spices, making their surfaces amenable to a class of bacteria (Brevibacterium linens, the reddish-orange smear bacteria) that impart pungent odors and distinctive flavors and produce a firm, flavorful rind around the cheese. Washed-rind cheeses can be soft (Limburger), semi-hard, or hard (Appenzeller). The same bacteria can also have some effect on cheeses that are simply ripened in humid conditions, like Camembert. The process requires regular washings, particularly in the early stages of production, making it quite labor-intensive compared to other methods of cheese production.

Examples

Soft (smear-ripened)

 Ardrahan
 Brick cheese
 Époisses
 Fontina
 Herve
 Langres
 Limburger
 Maroilles
 Mondseer
 Munster
 Pont-l'Évêque
 Saint-Nectaire
 Taleggio
 Tilsit

Hard (washed-rind)

 Gruyère
 Beaufort
 Appenzeller
 Oka cheese

See also

 Types of cheese

Bibliography

Notes